Greenspon was an art gallery located in the West Village of New York City owned by Amy Greenspon.

Founded on a partnership with art dealer Mitchell Algus, the gallery opened in the Fall of 2010 with an exhibition of paintings by Gene Beery and an inaugural musical performance by Emily Sundblad and Pete Drungle. Greenspon presented emerging and mid-career artists with diverse multidisciplinary practices, as well as museum-quality exhibitions.

Greenspon closed in 2018 following controversy surrounding the cancellation of an exhibition of work by alleged Neo-Nazi Boyd Rice.

Represented gallery artists

 Austė
 Gene Beery
 Bill Bollinger
 Christopher D'Arcangelo
 Ull Hohn
 E’wao Kagoshima
 Adriana Lara
 George Ortman
 Torbjørn Rødland
 Emily Sundblad
 Peter Young

Exhibitions

 the Seam, the Fault, the Flaw, June 28 – August 3, 2018
 Benedicte Gyldenstierne Sehested, You Be You, March 8 - May 5, 2018
 E'wao Kagoshima, February 3 – March 1, 2018
 Adriana Lara, The Future,  November 9, 2017 – January 20, 2018
 Mike Zahn, Adapter_Adapted &etc.,  September 26 – November 4, 2017
 Darren Bader, Forest/Trees, May 16 – July 28, 2017
 Rick Potts, March 4 – April 15, 2017
 Austė, October 22 – December 22, 2016
 Jesse Chapman & Shaun Krupa, Is Panpsychism the Engine of Art?,  July 12–August 5, 2016
 Bunny Rogers, Columbine Cafeteria, May 6 – June 25, 2016
 Wills Baker, curator, Detour  – Bruno Gironcoli, Eva Hesse, Tobias Pils, March 5 – April 23, 2016
 The Shadow is Taken, October 13 - December 12, 2015
 Torbjørn Rødland, Corpus Dubium, May 9 – June 20, 2015
 Adriana Lara, Underlying Patterns: Tragedy and Comedy Were Improvisations at First, part 2, February 21 – April 11, 2015
 Jason Kraus, Finished Objects, January 28 – February 21, 2015
 E’wao Kagoshima, October 14 – December 6, 2014
 Dave Miko, Ned Vena, Antek Walczak, Collaborative Painting & Text, July 22 – August 8, 2014
 Jesse Chapman, May 10 – July 12, 2014
 CMYK, April 3 – May 3, 2014
 William King, January 4 – February 15, 2014
 Peter Young, November 2 – December 21, 2013
 Torbjørn Rødland, September 10 – October 19, 2013
 Emily Sundblad, The Railbird, June 2 – July 2013
 Adriana Lara & Gene Beery, The Picnic, Friday, May 17 – Saturday, May 25, 2013
 Gene Beery, Early Paintings and Recent Photographs, March 16 – April 27, 2013
 Sebastian Black & Mathew Cerletty, curators, The Stairs, January 26 – March 10, 2013
 Adriana Lara, NY – USA, November 17, 2012 – January 19, 2013
 Peter Young, September 29 – November 12, 2012
 Inside the Banana, July 25 – September 22, 2012
 Bill Bollinger, April 21 – June 9, 2012
 Hans Breder, March 16 – April 14, 2012
 George Ortman, January 14 – March 10, 2012
 Mathew Cerletty, Susan, November 5 – December 23, 2011
 Christopher D’Arcangelo, Homage, October 11 – 29, 2011
 Invitation to the Voyage, September 10 – October 8, 2011
 Emily Sundblad, Que Barbaro, May 9 – June 18, 2011
 Stuart Brisley, March 12 – April 23, 2011
 E’wao Kagoshima, January 19 – March 5, 2011
 Ull Hohn, November 13, 2010 – January 8, 2011
 Gene Beery, September 11 – October 16, 2010

Sources

Press
 "Frieze Art Fair Opens With Strong Sales." Huffington Post, 2012.
 "Odd Couple: Mitchell Algus and Amy Greenspon Are Showing—and, Yes, Selling—the Unknown, the Emerging, the Dead". The Observer, 2012.
 "Best off-the-beaten-path art galleries", TimeOut New York, 2011.

Exhibitions press
 Troncone, Alessandra. "Darren Bader: The important thing is to participate" Flash Art, January 2018. 
 Wilson, Michael. "Adriana Lara" Artforum, February 2018.
 "Q&A, Adriana Lara, What is the ideal exhibition?" Spike Art Quarterly, Summer, 2017.
 Irvin, Nick, "LIFE: ★★★½." 'Art in America', November 1, 2016.
 Frank, Priscilla. "Artist Rebuilds Columbine's Cafeteria In A Sobering Take On Gun Violence." Huffington Post, June 2016.
 Schwendener, Martha. "Bunny Rogers' 'Columbine Cafeteria.'" The New York Times, June 2016.
 Nunes, Andrew. "A Haunting Exhibition Re-examines Columbine's Collective Trauma." The Creators Project, June 2016.
Cruikshank-Hagenbuckle, Geoffrey. "Class Plus Sass: Bunny Rogers' 'Columbine Cafeteria.'" Hyperallergic, May 2016.
 Krasinski, Jennifer. "Nothing's Sacred: Two Exhibitions Clown Around With Convention" The Village Voice,  2015.
 Steadman, Ryan. "These are the 7 Must-See Booths at Art Basel Miami 2015." The Observer, 2015. 
 Chiaverina, John. "Presidential Campaigns and Old Camp Counselors: At the Opening of the Jewish Museum's 'Unorthodox' Show." ARTnews, 2015.
 Prickett, Sarah Nicole. "Torbjørn Rødland." Artforum, 2015.
 Rosenberg, Karen. "E-wao Kagoshima." The New York Times, 2014.
 Beckenstein, Joyce. "William King." The Brooklyn Rail, 2014.
 Smith, Roberta. "Peter Young: 'Paintings'" The New York Times, 2102.
 Johnson, Ken. "Inside the Banana." The New York Times, 2012.
 Johnson, Ken. "An Afterlife for a Sculptor: Bill Bollinger's Works Resurface in Two Exhibitions." The New York Times, 2012.
 Smith, Roberta. "George Ortman Constructions: 1949–2011." The New York Times, 2012.
 Sanchez, Michael, "'How-To Paint Project' Michael Sanchez on Ull Hohn at Algus Greenspon, New York." Texte zur Kunst, 2011.
Cotter, Holland. "Anarchism without Adjectives: On the Work of Christopher D'Arcangelo." The New York Times, 2011.
 Rosenberg, Karen. "Invitation to the Voyage." The New York Times, 2011.
 Kley, Elisabeth. "Sunday Painter." artnet.com, 2011.
 Smith, Roberta. "Stuart Brisley." The New York Times, 2011.

References

External links
 greenspongallery.com
 Emily Sundblad performs with Matt Sweeney at Algus Greenspon Gallery, 2013.
 Emily Sundblad performs with Pete Drungle at Algus Greenspon Gallery, 2011.

Art museums and galleries in Manhattan
2010 establishments in New York City
West Village
Art galleries established in 2010